Kielce, and the Świętokrzyskie Voivodeship of which it the capital of, intend to adapt the airport in Masłów (near Kielce), for regional traffic. Its current runway is asphalt, and its size is 1115 x 30 meters. It is planned to develop the airport, but rather to the category of a City Airport. The local government have founded a company "Lotnisko Kielce" with the goal to upgrade the airport. There are also discussions to build a completely new airport in Obice.

Falcon 2000LXS SP-ARK of local businessman Michal Solowow is based here.

History
The airport opened in 1937. In 2011, the main runway (11/29) was extended from 900 m to 1,155 m.

See also
 List of airports in Poland
 Air ambulances in Poland

References

Airports in Poland
Kielce County
Buildings and structures in Świętokrzyskie Voivodeship